Philipp Pflieger (born 16 July 1987) is a German long distance runner who specialises in the marathon. He competed in the men's marathon event at the 2016 Summer Olympics where he finished in 55th place. In 2018, he competed in the men's marathon at the 2018 European Athletics Championships held in Berlin, Germany. He did not finish his race.

References

External links
 

1987 births
Living people
Place of birth missing (living people)
German male long-distance runners
German male marathon runners
Olympic male marathon runners
Olympic athletes of Germany
Athletes (track and field) at the 2016 Summer Olympics
German national athletics champions
20th-century German people
21st-century German people